The 2020–21 North Alabama Lions men's basketball team represented the University of North Alabama in the 2020–21 NCAA Division I men's basketball season. The Lions, led by third-year head coach Tony Pujol, played their home games at Flowers Hall in Florence, Alabama, as members of the Atlantic Sun Conference (ASUN).

This season marked North Alabama's third of a four-year transition period from Division II to Division I. As a result, the Lions are not eligible for NCAA postseason play, but could participate in the ASUN tournament. They were also eligible to play in the CBI tournament, but not invited. They finished the season 13-11, 7-8 in ASUN Play to finish in 5th place. They defeated North Florida and Florida Gulf Coast to advance to the championship game of the ASUN tournament where they lost to Liberty.

Previous season
The Lions finished the 2019–20 season 13–17, 8–8 in ASUN play, to finish in fifth place in the conference. They lost in the quarterfinals of the ASUN tournament to Stetson.

Roster

Schedule and results

|-
!colspan=12 style=| Non-conference regular season

|-
!colspan=12 style=| Atlantic Sun Conference regular season

|-
!colspan=12 style=| Atlantic Sun tournament
|-

|-

Source

References

North Alabama Lions men's basketball seasons
North Alabama Lions
North Alabama Lions men's basketball
North Alabama Lions men's basketball